Sweden held a national preselction named Melodifestivalen 1984 to choose the entry for the Eurovision Song Contest the same year. The winner was the three brothers Herrey, consisting of Richard, Louis and Per. Their song was called "Diggi-Loo Diggi-Ley", and was written by Britt Lindeborg and Torgny Söderberg.

Before Eurovision

Melodifestivalen 1984
Melodifestivalen 1984 was the selection for the 24th song to represent Sweden at the Eurovision Song Contest. It was the 23rd time that this system of picking a song had been used. 90 songs were submitted to SVT for the competition. The final was held in the Lisebergshallen in Gothenburg on 25 February 1984, presented by Fredrik Belfrage and was broadcast on TV1 but was not broadcast on radio. Herreys went on to win that year's Eurovision Song Contest in Luxembourg; Sweden's second Eurovision win.

Voting

At Eurovision 
Sweden was the first country to perform at ESC that year. In the voting, they received not less than 5 "douze points" from the other 18 countries. Finally the brothers were victorious, with a total of 145 points - 8 points ahead of Ireland. Sweden had won exactly 10 years earlier, then represented by ABBA.

Voting

References

External links
TV broadcastings at SVT's open archive

1984
Countries in the Eurovision Song Contest 1984
1984
Eurovision
Eurovision